Electoral reform is a change in electoral systems which alters how public desires are expressed in election results.

Description 
Reforms can include changes to:
 Voting systems, such as proportional representation, a two-round system (runoff voting), instant-runoff voting (alternative voting, ranked-choice voting, or preferential voting), Instant Round Robin Voting called Condorcet Voting, range voting, approval voting, citizen initiatives and referendums and recall elections.
 Vote-counting procedures
 Rules about political parties, typically changes to election laws
 Eligibility to vote (including widening of the vote, enfranchisement and extension of suffrage to those of certain age, gender or race/ethnicity previously excluded)
 How candidates and political parties are able to stand (nomination rules) and how they are able to get their names onto ballots (ballot access)
 Electoral constituencies and election district borders. This can include consideration of multiple-member districts as opposed to single-member districts.
 Ballot design and voting equipment. Preferential ballots as used in Single transferable voting necessitate different ballot design compared to X voting under First-past-the-post voting and some other systems.
 Scrutineering (election monitoring by candidates, political parties, etc.)
 Safety of voters and election workers
 Measures against bribery, coercion, and conflicts of interest
 Financing of candidates' and referendum campaigns
 Factors which affect the rate of voter participation (voter turnout)

Electoral reforms can contribute to democratic backsliding or may be advances toward wider and deeper democracy.

Nation-building 
In less democratic countries, elections are often demanded by dissidents; therefore the most basic electoral-reform project in such countries is to achieve a transfer of power to a democratically elected government with a minimum of bloodshed, e.g. in South Africa in 1994. This case highlights the complexity of such reform: such projects tend to require changes to national or other constitutions, and to alter balances of power. Electoral reforms are often politically painful and authorities may try to postpone them as long as possible, but at risk of rising unrest with potential of rebellion, political violence and/or civil war.

Role of United Nations 
The United Nations Fair Elections Commission provides international observers to national elections that are likely to face challenges by the international community of nations, e.g., in 2001 in Yugoslavia, in 2002 in Zimbabwe.

The United Nations standards address safety of citizens, coercion, scrutiny, and eligibility to vote. They do not impose ballot styles, party diversity, or borders on electoral constituencies. Various global political movements, e.g., labour movements, the Green party, Islamism, Zionism, advocate various cultural, social, ecological means of setting borders that they consider "objective" or "blessed" in some other way. Contention over electoral constituency borders within or between nations and definitions of "refugee", "citizen", and "right of return" mark various global conflicts, including those in Israel/Palestine, the Congo, and Rwanda.

Electoral borders 
Redrawing of electoral constituency (or "riding" or "district") borders should be conducted at regular intervals, or by statutory rules and definitions, if for no other reason than to eliminate malapportionment attributable to population movements. Some electoral reforms seek to fix these borders according to pre-existing jurisdictions or cultural or ecological criterion. Bioregional democracy sets borders to fit exactly to ecoregions to improve the management of the public's commonly-owned property and natural resources. Some electoral reforms seek to fix districts in such a way as to avoid the obvious abuse of gerrymandering in which constituency borders are set deliberately to favor one party over another.

Electoral borders and their manipulation have been a major issue in the United States, in particular. Due to political or legal obstacles preventing deeper electoral reform, such as multiple-member districts or proportional represtnation, "affirmative gerrymandering" has been used to create a district in which the targeted minority group such as blacks is in the majority and thus elects a representative of that group.

The lack of ability to respect 'natural' borders (meaning municipal or community or infrastructure or natural areas) appears in some criticisms of particular reforms, such as the Alternative Vote Plus system proposed for the United Kingdom  by Jenkins Commission, beccause of its use of artificial single-member districts. The use of districts of different District Magnitude, with varying number of seats in each district ranging from one to ten or more, allows electoral districts to conform to pre-existing districting, such as city corporate limits, counties or even small provinces, and the changing of number of members to be changed without the redrawing of district boundaries.  As well, multi-member districts are a component of many proportional representation systems.

By country

Australia 
The Proportional Representation Society of Australia advocates the single transferable vote and proportional representation.

Canada 
Several national and provincial organizations promote electoral reform, especially by advocating more party-proportional representation, as most regions of Canada have at least three competitive political parties (some four or five). 

Furthermore, Election Districts Voting advocates proportional representation electoral reforms that enable large majorities of voters to directly elect party candidates of choice, not just parties of choice. 

As well, a large non-party organization advocating electoral reform nationally is Fair Vote Canada but there are other advocacy groups. One such group is The Equal Vote Coalition who has organized a multi-year research campaign involving many of the world experts on electoral reform. 

Several referendums to decide whether or not to adopt such reform have been held at the provincial level in the last two decades; none has thus far resulted in a change from the plurality system currently in force. Controversially, the threshold for adoption of a new voting system has regularly been set at a "supermajority", for example, 60% of ballots cast approving the proposed system in order for the change to be implemented. In most provincial referendums the change side was roundly defeated, gaining less than 40% support in most cases. But in two cases a majority of voters voted for change. 

In 2005, a majority of votes cast in an electoral reform referendum held in BC were cast in favor of change.

In the case of the November 7, 2016 electoral reform plebiscite on Prince Edward Island, the government declined to specify in advance how it would use the results. Although Mixed Member Proportional Representation won the 5-option ranked ballot with 52% of the final vote vs. 42% for first-past-the-post, the PEI government has so far not committed to implementing a proportional voting system, citing the turnout of 36% as making it "doubtful whether these results can be said to constitute a clear expression of the will of Prince Edward Islanders". PEI regularly sees turnout above 80% in most elections. 

Seven provincial level referendums on electoral reform have been held to date:
 2005 British Columbia electoral reform referendum
 2005 Prince Edward Island electoral reform referendum
 2007 Ontario electoral reform referendum
 2009 British Columbia electoral reform referendum
 2016 Prince Edward Island electoral reform referendum
 2018 British Columbia electoral reform referendum
 2019 Prince Edward Island electoral reform referendum

During the 2015 federal election all three opposition parties promised some measure of electoral reform before the next federal election. The NDP promised to implement mixed-member proportional representation with regional and open party lists, based on the 2004 recommendations of the Law Commission, and the Liberals simply promised to form an all-party committee to investigate various electoral reform options "including proportional representation, ranked ballots, mandatory voting and online voting." The Liberal leader, who is now prime minister, Justin Trudeau, is believed to prefer a winner-take-all, preferential voting system known as Instant Runoff Voting; however, there are many prominent members of his caucus and cabinet who openly support proportional representation (Stephane Dion, Dominic Leblanc, Chrystia Freeland, and others). In 2012 Dion authored an editorial for the National Post advocating his variation of Proportional Representation by the Single Transferable Vote dubbed "P3" (proportional, preferential and personalised). Regardless, Trudeau has promised to approach the issue with an open mind. Conservative interim leader, Rona Ambrose, has indicated a willingness to investigate electoral reform options, but her party's emphatic position is that any reform must first be approved by the voters in a referendum. The Liberal government's position is that a referendum is unnecessary as they clearly campaigned on making "2015 Canada's last First Past the Post election." The Green Party of Canada has always been supportive of proportional representation. At the party's Special General Meeting in Calgary on December 5, 2016, Green Party members passed a resolution endorsing Mixed Member Proportional Representation as its preferred model, while maintaining an openness to any proportional voting system producing an outcome with a score of 5 or less on the Gallagher Index.

The Liberal members of the special all-committee on electoral reform urged Prime Minister Justin Trudeau to break his promise to change Canada's voting system before the next federal election in 2019. That call for inaction came as opposition members of the committee pressured Trudeau to keep the commitment. In its final report, Strengthening Democracy in Canada, the Standing Committee on Electoral Reform recommended the government design a new proportional system and hold a national referendum to gauge Canadians' support.

In December 2016-January 2017, the Government of Canada undertook a survey of Canadian opinion regarding electoral reform, with some 360,000 responses received.

On February 1, 2017, the Liberal Minister of Democratic Institutions, Karina Gould, announced that a change of voting system would no longer be in her mandate, citing a lack of broad consensus among Canadians on what voting system would be best.

The Province of Ontario recently permitted the use of Instant Runoff Voting, often called the "ranked ballot," for municipal elections. IRV is not a proportional voting system and is opposed by both Election Districts Voting and Fair Vote Canada for provincial or federal elections.

Czechia 
The electoral threshold for multi-party coalitions was reformed due to a court ruling from 10% to 8% for two-party coalitions.

Denmark 
The Danish electoral system was reformed from first-past-the-post voting to additional member system in 1915 and proportional representation in 1920.

European Union 
An minimum electoral threshold of 3.5% has been proposed by the European Parliament. A minimum electoral threshold is considered unconstitutional by German courts and was not applied in Germany. Transnational party-lists have been proposed for the European parliament elections.

Georgia 
Changes to the electoral threshold in Georgia are considered.

Germany 

In 1953 the federal state electoral threshold was replaced with a national electoral threshold, reducing party fragmentation. In 1972 the voting age was lowered from 21 to 18.
The seat allocation method was 1987 switched from the D'Hondt method to largest remainder method and 2009 to Webster/Sainte-Laguë method, due to concerns of lower proportionality for small parties.

The 2013 the compensation mechanism was adjusted to reduce the negative vote weight in compensating between federal states. 

In 2023, the German Parliament adopted a  federal electoral law reform which replaced the flexible number of seats with a fixed size of 630 seats and removed the provision which allowed parties which won at least 3 single-member seats to be exempt from the 5% electoral threshold.

Hungary 

In 2012 a Mixed-member majoritarian voting system with a combination of parallel and positive vote transfer was introduced.

India 

Electoral bonds allowing anonymous contributions to political parties were introduced in 2017, and the limit on financial contributions by companies was removed.

Iraq 
In 2020 the proportional representation with modified Sainte-Laguë method for seat allocation was reformed to single non-transferable vote.

Israel 
There is continuous talk in Israel about "governability" ("משילות" in Hebrew). The following reforms were carried in the last three decades:
 Between 1996–2001 the PM was elected directly, while keeping a strong parliament. Direct election for the PM was abandoned afterwards, amid disappointment with the change. The earlier Westminster system was reinstated like it was before.
 The minimum threshold a party needs to enter parliament was gradually raised. It was 1% until 1988; it was then raised to 1.5% and remained at that level until 2003, when it was again raised to 2%. On March 11, 2014, the Knesset approved a new law to raise the threshold to 3.25% (approximately 4 seats).
 The process of throwing off an existing coalition government was slowly made harder, and now it is nearly impossible to impeach a government without triggering a new election. As of 2015, one needs to present a full new government with a majority support in order to impeach a government. This too, was done gradually between 1996 and 2014.

Lesotho 
Lesotho reformed in 2002 to a mixed-member proportional representation, where parties could choose to not run for either constituency seats or party-list seats. This prevented the compensatory mechanism and effectively resulted in parallel voting. Further reform in 2012 introduced mixed single-voting, forcing parties to run for both constituency seats or party-list seats and improving the proportionality.

New Zealand 

Electoral reform in New Zealand began in 1986 with the report of the Royal Commission on the Electoral System entitled Towards A Better Democracy.  The Royal Commission recommended that Mixed Member Proportional (MMP) be adopted instead of the current first-past-the-post system. After two referendums in 1992 and 1993, New Zealand adopted MMP.
In 2004, some local body elections in New Zealand were elected using single transferable vote instead of the block vote.

Slovakia 
The period where opinion polls are banned before elections has been extended 2019 from 14 to 50 days, one of the longest blackout periods in the world. The Slovak courts considered this change unconstitutional. In 2022 this blackout period was reduced to 48 hours.

South Korea 
South Korea reformed in 2019 from parallel voting to Mixed-member proportional representation. The formation of satellite parties reduced the effectiveness of this reform.

Taiwan 
Taiwan reformed 2008 from the single non-transferable vote to parallel voting.
A constitutional referendum will be held 2022 to reduce voting age from 20 to 18.

Thailand 
Thailand reformed in 2019 from parallel voting to a Mixed-member proportional representation with mixed single vote. Further reform in 2021 reduces the party fragmentation by increasing the natural threshold, but an explicit electoral threshold has not been introduced.

United Kingdom 

The United Kingdom has generally used first-past-the-post (FPTP) for many years, but there have been several attempts at reform. A 1910 Royal Commission on Electoral Systems recommended AV be adopted for the Commons. A very limited introduction of single transferable vote (STV) came in the Government of Ireland Act 1914. A Speaker's Conference on electoral reform in January 1917 unanimously recommended a mix of AV and STV for elections to the House of Commons. However, that July the Commons rejected STV by 32 votes in the committee stage of the Representation of the People Bill, and by 1 vote substituted alternative vote (AV). The House of Lords then voted for STV, but the Commons insisted on AV. In a compromise, AV was abandoned and the Boundary Commission were asked to prepare a limited plan of STV to apply to 100 seats. This plan was then rejected by the Commons, although STV was introduced for the university constituencies.

On 8 April 1921, a Private Member's Bill to introduce STV was rejected 211 votes to 112 by the Commons. A Liberal attempt to introduce an Alternative Vote Bill in March 1923 was defeated by 208 votes to 178. On 2 May 1924, another Private Member's Bill for STV was defeated 240 votes to 146 in the Commons.

In January 1931, the minority Labour government, then supported by the Liberals, introduced a Representation of the People Bill that included switching to AV. The Bill passed its second reading in the Commons by 295 votes to 230 on 3 February 1931 and the clause introducing AV was passed at committee stage by 277 to 251. (The Speaker had refused to allow discussion of STV.) The Bill's second reading in the Lords followed in June, with an amendment replacing AV with STV in 100 constituencies being abandoned as outside the scope of the Bill. An amendment was passed by 80 votes to 29 limiting AV to constituencies in boroughs with populations over 200,000. The Bill received its third reading in the Lords on 21 July, but the Labour government fell in August and the Bill was lost.

Following the wartime coalition government, a landslide victory for the Labour Party in 1945 began a period of two-party dominance in British electoral politics, in which the Conservatives and Labour interchanged power with almost total dominance over seats won and votes cast (See British General Elections since 1945). There existed no incentive for these parties to embrace a pluralist voting system in such a political settlement, and so neither supported it, and electoral reform fell off the radar for several decades.

With the rise of the SDP-Liberal Alliance in 1981, Britain now featured a popular third-party bloc who supported significant reform of the voting and parliamentary systems. Several polls throughout the early 1980s placed the Alliance in front of Labour and the Conservatives, and nearly all had them within contention. The continuing Liberal Party had until then received minimal support at elections and little influence on government, with the brief exception of the Lib-Lab Pact in the late 1970s, but in which their influence was somewhat limited. Despite receiving roughly a quarter of the popular vote in both 1983 and 1987 however, few SDP-Liberal candidates were elected owing to FPTP requiring a plurality in each constituency and their vote being spread far more evenly geographically than the main parties. Therefore, the Conservatives, who benefited from overrepresentation of their vote and underrepresentation of the Alliance vote, won large majorities during this period and reform remained off the agenda.

Elections to the European Parliament in mainland Britain from their start in 1979 used FPTP, but were switched to list PR in the 1999 elections following pressure to standardise with the rest of the EU.

When Labour regained power in 1997, they had committed in their manifesto to a slew of new reformist policies relating to modernisation and democratisation of various institutions through electoral reform. For General Elections, they had committed to implementing the findings of the Jenkins Commission, which was set up to evaluate flaws in FPTP and propose a new electoral system that would suit the quirks of British politics. The commission reported back, including a proposal for AV+, but its findings were not embraced by the government and were never put before the House of Commons, therefore FPTP remained in place for these elections. They introduced a number of new assemblies, in London, Wales and Scotland, and opted for additional member systems of PR in all of these. They also adopted the supplementary vote system for directly elected mayors. While not specifically committing to elections by name, they had promised to abolish all hereditary peers in the House of Lords and establish a system by which representation in the Lords "more accurately reflected the proportion of votes cast at the previous election." Having faced continual pressure against any reform from the Lords themselves, Blair was forced to water-down his proposals and agree to a settlement with Conservative leader in the Lords in which 92 hereditary peers would remain, along with faith-based peers, and all others would be life peers appointed by either the Prime Minister directly, or on the recommendation of an independent panel. In Scotland, a Labour/Liberal Democrat coalition in the new Scottish Parliament later introduced STV for local elections. However, such reforms encountered problems.  When 7% of votes (over 140,000) were discounted or spoilt in the 2007 Scottish Parliamentary and local council elections, Scottish First Minister Alex Salmond protested that "the decision to conduct an STV election at the same time as a first-past-the-post ballot for the Scottish Parliament was deeply mistaken".

In the 2010 general election campaign, the possibility of a hung parliament and the earlier expenses scandal pushed electoral reform up the agenda, something long supported by the Liberal Democrats. There were protests in favour of electoral reform organised by Take Back Parliament. The Conservative-Liberal Democrat coalition government held a referendum on introducing AV for the Commons on 5 May 2011, which, despite commitments to review the voting system for "fair vote reforms" in the Conservative manifesto, and an unequivocal backing of AV from the Labour Party in their manifesto, was met by campaigning for No, and indifference with no clear or consistent party position, respectively. It was comprehensively defeated. The result of the referendum has had long-lasting political repercussions, being cited by later Conservative governments as proof that public opinion was decidedly against any reform of the voting system. As the Conservatives have been in government in some form or another since, electoral reform has never seriously been close to implementation post-2011.

The coalition had also committed to reforming the House of Lords into a primarily elected body, and a bill proposing elections under PR determining the majority of membership was put before the House in 2012. The bill was pulled before passage however, as while the government imposed a three-line whip on its MPs to support the measure, an enormous rebellion of Conservatives was brewing. Matters were not helped by the Labour Party promising to vote against the measures, despite having promised to support similar such measures in the manifesto in 2010. To avoid a painful and humiliating defeat, Deputy Prime Minister Nick Clegg, who had instigated the bill's passage and whose Liberal Democrat party had long-since supported the reform, was forced to back down. Clegg accused the Conservatives of breaking the coalition agreement, and Prime Minister David Cameron was said to be furious at his backbenchers for endangering the government's stability and authority. (See main article: House of Lords Reform Bill 2012)

The 2015 general election was expected to deliver a hung parliament. In the end the Conservative Party won a narrow majority, winning 51% of the seats on 37% of the national vote, but the Green Party, UKIP and the Liberal Democrats were under-represented and the Scottish National Party over-represented in the results compared to a proportional system. As a result, both during the campaign and after, there were various calls for electoral reform. Nigel Farage, leader of UKIP, declared support for AV+. Baron O'Donnell, the Cabinet Secretary from 2005 to 2011, argued that FPTP is not fit for purpose given the move towards multi-party politics seen in the country. Journalist Jeremy Paxman also supported a move away from FPTP.

In 2016, it was reported that in a conversation with a Labour peer in 1997, the Queen had expressed her opposition to changing the voting system to proportional representation.

In 2021 home secretary Priti Patel proposed replacing the supplementary vote method used in some elections in England and Wales with first-past-the-post. The posts affected are the Mayor of London, elected mayors in nine combined authorities in England, and police and crime commissioners in England and Wales. In the Queen's Speech of May that year, the Government proposed the introduction of compulsory Photo ID for voters in England and in UK-wide elections.

A number of groups in the United Kingdom are campaigning for electoral reform including the Electoral Reform Society, Make Votes Matter, Make Votes Count Coalition, Fairshare, and the Labour Campaign for Electoral Reform. In the lead up to, and especially since the 2019 General Election, various anti-Brexit pressure groups and online political influencers have pivoted to a stance supporting and calling for widespread tactical voting to bring about more favourable election results under FPTP to those parties that support reform, most notably Best for Britain. In its most comprehensive form, such proposals include a national roll-out of the Unite to Remain pact in 2019, in which the Liberal Democrats, Greens, and Plaid Cymru stood down in some constituencies and endorsed each other for election, but on a much wider scale and including the Labour Party, with the expressed aim of building a rainbow coalition that could enact PR in a new parliament. Their campaign for soft-left cooperation is ongoing and have primarily focused on social media initiatives and sponsoring research into voting patterns. While a so-called progressive alliance has seen significant discourse in left-leaning spaces, particularly on Twitter, it is thought unlikely to ever happen. The Labour Party does not support electoral reform and has a clause in their constitution (section 5, clause IV) requiring them to stand candidates in every parliamentary seat bar Northern Ireland. Senior figures in Labour, the Liberal Democrats, and Greens have, with varying degrees of explicitness, all dismissed the idea. There is also concern that such a proposal would not function as intended if implemented, as none of the 92 constituencies Unite to Remain operated in were successful, and some believe both that voters would react negatively to what could be perceived as “backroom deals” and “stitch-ups,” or that association with the other parties would harm each one's reputation with target voters.

A reform of Welsh Parliament to closed proportional lists has been announced 2022.

United States 

Electoral reform is a continuing process in the United States, motivated by fear of both electoral fraud and disfranchisement. There are also extensive debates of the fairness and effects of the Electoral College, existing voting systems, and campaign financing laws, as well as the proposals for reform. There are also initiatives to end gerrymandering, a process by which state legislatures alter the borders of representative districts to increase the chances of their candidates winning their seats (cracking), and concentrating opponents in specific districts to eliminate their influence in other districts (packing).

Ukraine 
Ukraine reformed in 2020 from parallel voting to Proportional representation.

References

Further reading
 Dummett, Michael (1997). Principles of Electoral Reform. New York: Oxford University Press.

External links

International
 A Handbook of Electoral System Design from International IDEA
 ACE Project

United States
 AEI-Brookings Election Reform
 Caltech/MIT Voting Technology Project
 Fairvote

Canada
 Election Districts Voting
 Fair Vote Canada
 Paul McKeever's Testimony to the Select Committee on Electoral Reform (Canada): No electoral system is more "democratic" than any other
 Electoral Reform Canada
 Voting Reform Canada 
 FPTP ... It Works for Canada / Notre Systeme Electoral ... Ca March pour Moi (Facebook group)

Australia
 PR Society of Australia

United Kingdom
 Electoral Reform Society (UK) 
 Guide to different types of Electoral Reform – New Statesman (UK)
 Guardian Special Report – Electoral Reform